Bradbury is a village in County Durham, England. Bradbury is a small agricultural village. The moorland around it is of glacial origin.

It is part of the civil parish of Bradbury and the Isle, along with the hamlets of Great Isle and Little Isle. 'The Isles' is an area in the parish located by the River Skerne. Historically, the river has been prone to flooding here; when flooded a number of small islands of land remain above the floodwaters. These include Great Isle and Little Isle, on which stand Great Isle farm and the hamlet of Little Isle, respectively. The parish had a population of 95 according to the 2001 census, increasing to 133 at the 2011 census.

References

External links

Villages in County Durham